Inanidrilus scalprum is a species of annelid worm. It is known from subtidal coral sands in Belize, in the Caribbean Sea. Preserved specimens measure  in length.

References

scalprum
Invertebrates of Central America
Taxa named by Christer Erséus
Fauna of the Caribbean
Animals described in 1984